Felix Katongo (born 18 April 1984) is a Zambian professional footballer who plays for as a midfielder for Green Buffaloes. Between 2004 and 2016, he made 68 FIFA-official appearances scoring 5 goals for the Zambia national team. His older brother Christopher was also an international player.

Club career
Born in Mufulira, Katongo has played club football in Zambia, South Africa, Angola, France and Libya for Butondo Western Tigers, Forest Rangers, Green Buffaloes, Jomo Cosmos, Petro Atlético, Rennes B, LB Châteauroux, Mamelodi Sundowns and Al-Ittihad. Katongo's career in Libya was cut short by the 2011 Libyan civil war, which saw the Zambian government sending a plane to rescue him. In June 2014, he moved to the Egyptian side Al Ittihad on a three-year deal.

International career
Katongo made his international debut for Zambia in 2004, and he has appeared in FIFA World Cup qualifying matches.

In January 2012, he was selected to Zambia's 23-man squad for the 2012 Africa Cup of Nations. He was also called up to Zambia's 23-man squad for the 2013 Africa Cup of Nations.

International goals
Scores and results list Zambia's goal tally first.

References

1984 births
Living people
People from Mufulira
Zambian footballers
Zambia international footballers
Zambian expatriate footballers
Zambian expatriate sportspeople in South Africa
2006 Africa Cup of Nations players
2008 Africa Cup of Nations players
2010 Africa Cup of Nations players
2012 Africa Cup of Nations players
2013 Africa Cup of Nations players
Jomo Cosmos F.C. players
Expatriate footballers in France
Stade Rennais F.C. players
LB Châteauroux players
Expatriate soccer players in South Africa
Mamelodi Sundowns F.C. players
Zambian expatriate sportspeople in Angola
Association football midfielders
Expatriate footballers in Angola
Zambian expatriate sportspeople in France
Expatriate footballers in Egypt
Ligue 2 players
Atlético Petróleos de Luanda players
Green Buffaloes F.C. players
Al-Ittihad Club (Tripoli) players
Africa Cup of Nations-winning players
Forest Rangers F.C. players
Libyan Premier League players